EnRUPT is a block cipher and a family of cryptographic algorithms based on XXTEA.
EnRUPT hash function was submitted to SHA-3 competition but it wasn't selected to the second round.

References

Broken block ciphers
Feistel ciphers
Articles with example C code